Autoerotic may refer to:

 Autoeroticism, the practice of becoming sexually stimulated through internal stimuli
 Erotic target location errors (ETLEs), a class of sexual interests in which sexual arousal depends on imagining one's self in another form, such as an animal, child, or the other sex
 Autoerotic (film), a 2011 film by Joe Swanberg